Fabian Stankowicz is a fictional character appearing in American comic books published by Marvel Comics. The character has been depicted as comic relief, a former supervillain foe of and then support crewmember of the Avengers. He first appeared in Avengers #217 (March 1982).

History
Fabian Stankowicz is a lottery winner who used his winnings to gain notoriety as a supervillain by using his engineering talent to invent powered armor suits.

Under the alias of the Mecho-Marauder, Fabian Stankowicz challenged the Avengers when he arrived at Avengers Mansion. Unfortunately for him, the Avengers recognized from the start that he was not a major threat, but rather an annoyance instead. For instance, during his first assault on the Avengers, Fabian Stankowicz was challenged by Iron Man. The armored hero considered this dilettante so minor a problem that when several fellow Avengers passed by at various times and inquired if their ally needed assistance, Iron Man casually declined and they departed from the scene without comment.

After that defeat, Fabian Stankowicz attempted to attack the team multiple times. Using a larger suit of armor, Fabian Stankowicz crashed an Avengers female recruitment tea party which was made up of Black Widow, Dazzler, Invisible Woman, She-Hulk, Spider-Woman, and Wasp. Fabian was easily defeated by Wasp.

Fabian Stankowicz was among the villains (consisting of Beetle, Blacklash, Doctor Doom, the Grapplers, Mad Thinker, Mirage, MODOK, Mole Man, Rhino, and Shellshock) that attempted to attack Thing while he was recuperating from his fight with the Champion. Yet Fabian Stankowicz was defeated by Spider-Man.

He attacked a group of Avengers when they appeared on Late Night with David Letterman. The superheros were at a stalemate, partly because the innocent audience members were in danger and the villain's use of forcefields. David Letterman recognized that he was in reach of the man; he knocked out Fabian Stankowicz with one swing of a large prop doorknob. Fabian tried to run away, but was caught by Mockingbird.

Wanting to reform, Fabian Stankowicz under the alias of Mechanaut joined Blue Shield, Gladiatrix, and Speedball into applying for membership in the Avengers. Yet Captain America was busy with something else at the time. When the four would-be Avengers witnessed the arrival of Darkstar, Ursa Major, and Vanguard, the group mistook them as enemies and fought them. Mechanaut fought Vanguard and was thrown into Blue Shield. The fight ended when Captain America arrived and told the would-be Avengers to call him again in six months.

Captain America summoned Fabian Stankowicz back to Avengers Island to serve as the group's inventor. Fabian agreed and assisted the Avengers in recovering Red Skull's fourth sleeper from Massachusetts. Machinesmith brought the sleeper to life which was defeated by Captain America.

Captain America gave Fabian the skull of Ulysses Bloodstone. Fabian attached a radiometer to it so that it can help to locate the fragments of the Bloodstone. Captain America took off immediately to begin his search.

During the "Acts of Vengeance" storyline, Fabian was present with the Avengers Island staff and Quasar discussing the recent attack on the Avengers when Avengers Island is suddenly attacked by Doctor Doom's killer robots. Fabian donned the Mecho-Marauder armor to help fight the killer robots. He managed to defeat some of them and then had to be rescued from the rest by Quasar. Fabian and the rest of the staff were evacuated from Avengers Island before it was destroyed by some explosives that the robots planted. Upon returning from his quest, Captain America learned from Fabian and the rest of the support crew what had happened to Avengers Island. The support crew moved their base of operations to the sub-basement of the original Avengers Mansion. When Namor the Sub-Mariner turned up under the control of the Controller, Captain America paired Fabian up with Hank Pym to find a way to remove the Controller's control device from Namor. Thanks to Henry Pym's success at removing Controller's control device being removed from Namor, Fabian watched as Namor came to his senses. When Captain America ends up attacked by mechanical tendrils upon entering the sub-basement, Fabian apologized for that stating that he was testing them out. Fabian then helps Captain America research some information about Magneto.

When the Daily Bugle was leveled by Graviton, the Avengers were called in to help Damage Control during its worker strike. Fabian tried to use some pulleys to help She-Hulk which proved unsuccessful.

Captain America had Fabian and John Jameson occupy Diamondback while he met with Eric Masterson. Fabian welcomed Captain America back to Avengers Mansion upon his return.

Mother Night used her hypnotic vision of Fabian's mother to sway Fabian to place some bugs throughout Avengers Mansion so that she can collect information. Fabian later joined the Avengers in attending a party in Sersi's loft when Fabian is visited by Mother Night and her brother Minister Blood. Mother Night and Minister Blood had placed the support crew under hypnotic control and had outfitted them with guns in a plot to assassinate the Avengers. Unfortunately, Sersi turned Fabian's gun into a toy gun and Mother Night and Minister Blood were forced to release the support crew from their hypnotic control.

At a friend's party, Fabian began taking ice, a drug from a dealer named Kid Gloves in Queens. He takes this drug to cope with the pressure of working for the Avengers. He lost a lot of weight and began to hear voices in his head. Michael O'Brien began to suspect that something was wrong with Fabian. Captain America then learned about the drugs that have affected Fabian and prepared him for a rehabilitation clinic. When Fabian stated about the super-soldier serum, Captain America stated that it was a different matter.

Fabian later received a clean bill of health and returned to working for the Avengers. Fabian and the support crew later attended Captain America's birthday party.

Fabian assisted the rest of the support crew in processing Rage's security clearance check at the Avengers Headquarters which was successful. Fabian then assisted the support crew in assisting Captain America when they were monitoring the fight between the Avengers and Ngh the Unspeakable.

Fabian assisted Captain America in searching for the Watchdogs by providing him a list of missing people whose moral conduct was reprehensible in the Watchdogs' eyes. When Captain America returned looking for John Jameson, Fabian stated that he hasn't seen him.

As the Avengers hold their grand opening of the Avengers Headquarters, Fabian, Michael O'Brien, and John Jameson in the security area monitoring the guests. He witnessed the intrusion of several Doombots which were taken down by Captain America, Sandman, and Vision.

When Lord Vashti Cleito-Son was found beaten by a gang, Namor brought him to the Avengers Headquarters for treatment. Fabian and the support crew helped in caring for Vashti.

Fabian and the support crew joined the Guardians of the Galaxy in fighting off Doctor Octopus' Masters of Evil while the Avengers were caught up in the events of the "Infinity War."

Fabian had Captain America's new pilot Zachary Moonhunter test out the new skycycle that Fabian built for Captain America.

After one of his robots upsets Luna's nanny Marilla at Avengers Headquarters, she threatened to have Fabian fired. Convinced that his career was over, Fabian forged a suicide note. He tried to jump off the bridge, but couldn't do it. Fabian encountered the vigilante Blistik who goaded Fabian to jump off the bridge stating that he wouldn't be missed. This didn't work and Blistik was defeated when Captain America arrived. Captain America found out about what happened and invited Fabian back.

Fabian declined Captain America and Diamondback's offer to help him pack his things. As Captain America began to move into his new base, Fabian complained that his stuff from Avengers Headquarters hasn't been sent. Fabian met with Captain America to figure out who had been impersonating Captain America and battling seemingly-dead supervillains. When Arnold "Arnie" Roth joined Captain America's team at the Stars and Stripes Headquarters, Fabian gave Arnold a tour. When Captain America was suffering from a breakdown of the super-soldier serum, Fabian designed a special battle-vest for Captain America which contained several gadgets that would give Captain America an edge in battle.

Using an armor built for him by Iron Man, Captain America gathers Fabian, Arnold "Arnie" Roth, Moonhunter, Jack Flag, and Free Spirit at the Stars and Stripes Headquarters where he told them that he didn't have long to live but intends to keep fighting as long as he could. Donning a suit of armor, Fabian went into a training session with Jack Flag and Free Spirit. The two managed to trounce Fabian easily. Fabian accompanies Jack Flag and Free Spirit to the hospital to visit Arnold "Arnie" Roth after he had a heart attack. Afterward, they set out with Captain America to head to A.I.M. Island for an invasion. Fabian brought along a bunch of robots to act as the diversion while Captain America, Falcon, Jack Flag, and Free Spirit invaded the island. While Captain America continued his mission, Fabian remained on the Freedom's Flight with Moonhunter. As A.I.M. Island is being torn apart by A.I.M.'s attempt to create a new Cosmic Cube, Fabian helped to evacuate the civilians into the Freedom's Flight.

After a homeless man was found stabbed in the subway, Fabian revealed to Captain America that he had been carrying an invitation that Captain America was invited to. Captain America decided to investigate. Upon learning from Black Crow that he will be dead within 24 hours, Captain America summoned Jack Flag, Free Spirit, Fabian, and Moonhunter to a meeting and gave them paperwork that is needed to keep the Stars and Stripes Hotline running. All four of his allies moved in and hugged Captain America just in case it was their last chance.

Fabian returned to the services of the Avengers, but was laid off when the Avengers apparently died fighting Onslaught. Fabian refused to believe that the Avengers are disbanding and was convinced that new heroes must take their place. He spent his time salvaging Sentinel technology left behind from Onslaught's attack. During his work, he lost some weight and grew a beard. He ran into Edwin Jarvis on the streets and alarmed him by his mutterings and appearance. Fabian designed a cybernetic helmet to control the Sentinels he had rebuilt into the Protectorate that is modeled after the Avengers. But the Sentinel programming began to take effect on Fabian's fragile psyche ended up falling under the program's control. The Protectorate set out to defend New York, but their Sentinel programming was still active regarding the Avengers as foes due to the fact that they had mutants on their team. Edwin Jarvis suspected that Fabian was behind this and located him in a warehouse where the Protectorate had been built. Edwin Jarvis made Fabian realize that the Avengers had returned and was mortified that he was their enemy. Fabian then had Edwin Jarvis remove his helmet and smash the motherboard controlling the Protectorate. Fabian was reunited with the Avengers and was sent to the hospital where he apologized to them for what he had done.

Powers and abilities
Fabian Stankowicz has genius-level intellect. He has the talent at making armored battle-suits, robots, security devices, and accessories.

Fabian's Mecho-Marauder armor has enhanced strength and could fire energy blasts.

Fabian's Mechanaut armor also had extendable limbs and knock-out gas.

References

External links
 

Characters created by Jim Shooter
Comics characters introduced in 1982
Fictional inventors
Marvel Comics supervillains